Michael Alexander Hopkins (12 August 1959 – 30 December 2012) was a New Zealand sound editor. Hopkins and American Ethan Van der Ryn shared two Academy Awards for best sound editing on the films The Lord of the Rings: The Two Towers and King Kong. The pair were also nominated for their work on the 2007 film Transformers.

Hopkins died on 30 December 2012 after the raft he was in capsized in a flash flood on the Waiohine River, near his hometown of Greytown.

References

External links

1959 births
2012 deaths
Natural disaster deaths in New Zealand
Deaths by drowning in New Zealand
Deaths in floods
Sound editors
Best Sound Editing Academy Award winners
People from Greytown, New Zealand